Erland von Hofsten (7 August 1719 – 8 June 1758), was a Swedish ironmaster, chamberlain, and heir to the Villingsberg Works.

Life and work 

Erland von Hofsten was born on August 7, 1719, and was the first of nine children of Bengt Erlandsson Hofsten and Ingrid Brita Kolthoff.

In 1733, he enrolled at Uppsala University. In 1740, he began serving as a hovjunkare, and in 1742 as a chamberlain.

Von Hofsten was ironmaster to both Villingsberg and Valåsen Works, in present-day Karlskoga Municipality. In addition, Von Hofsten is known to have been an importer of East Indian Porcelain.

In 1743, Erland von Hofsten married Christina Kolthoff. They were both buried at Knista Cemetery.

References 

1719 births
1758 deaths
18th-century Swedish landowners
Swedish ironmasters
People from Karlskoga Municipality
18th-century Swedish nobility
Erland
Chamberlains
18th-century ironmasters